Martin Ivanov (born 11 July 1988, Sliven) is a Bulgarian judoka. At the 2012 Summer Olympics he competed in the Men's 66 kg, but was defeated in the second round.

References

Bulgarian male judoka
Living people
Olympic judoka of Bulgaria
Judoka at the 2012 Summer Olympics
European Games competitors for Bulgaria
Sambo practitioners at the 2015 European Games
Sambo practitioners at the 2019 European Games
Universiade medalists in judo
1988 births
People from Pernik
Universiade bronze medalists for Bulgaria
Medalists at the 2013 Summer Universiade
Medalists at the 2009 Summer Universiade
21st-century Bulgarian people